The CMLL World Trios Championship (Spanish: "Campeonato Mundial de Trios") is a professional wrestling championship promoted by Consejo Mundial de Lucha Libre (CMLL) in Mexico. The title has existed since 1991 and is contested for by teams of three wrestlers. As it is a professional wrestling championship, it is not won or lost competitively but instead by the decision of the bookers of a wrestling promotion. The title is awarded to the chosen team after they "win" a match to maintain the illusion that professional wrestling is a competitive sport.

The first champions were Los Infernales ("The Infernal Ones"; MS-1, Pirata Morgan and El Satánico) who won a tournament on November 22, 1991. Since then 28 trios have held the championship. The current champions are Los Cancerberos del Infierno (Virus, Raziel and Cancerbero) after having defeated Stuka Jr., Guerrero Maya Jr. and Star Jr. to win the vacant titles on April 24, 2021. The championship has been vacated on four occasions, each time leading to CMLL holding a tournament to determine new champions. Only two teams have held the title on more than one occasion, Los Infernales and the trio of Héctor Garza, Hijo del Fantasma and La Máscara.

History
With the emergence of trios (tag teams consisting of three people) such as Los Misioneros de la Muerte, Los Brazos and more, the six-man tag team match became increasingly popular in the early 1980s. Its popularity led to the trios format becoming the most prevalent match format in Lucha libre to this day. In 1985, the Mexican lucha libre, or professional wrestling, promotion Empresa Mexicana de Lucha Libre ("Mexican Wrestling Enterprise"; EMLL) was given control of the newly created Mexican National Trios Championship. Over the subsequent six years, that championship became the focal point of the very popular trios division, serving as the highest honor EMLL could bestow on a trio at the time. In 1991, EMLL changed their name to Consejo Mundial de Lucha Libre ("World Wrestling Council") and began to establish a series of CMLL-branded world championships, relegating the Mexican National championships to being a secondary level of championships within the company. In 1991, CMLL added a CMLL-branded world championship for the trios division. They held a 16-team tournament to crown the first champions, a tournament that saw "Los Infernales" ("The Infernal Ones"; MS-1, Pirata Morgan and El Satánico) defeat "Los Brazos" ("The Arms"; El Brazo, Brazo de Oro and Brazo de Plata) to become the first CMLL World Trios Champions. Over the next couple of years, the championship would be held by such teams as "Los Intocables" ("The Untouchables" Jaque Mate, Masakre and Pierroth Jr.) and "La Ola Blanca" ("The White Wave"; Gran Markus Jr., El Hijo del Gladiador and Dr. Wagner Jr.). In 1993, the then-reigning Mexican National Trios Champions left CMLL, and the Mexico City Boxing and wrestling commission allowed the champions to take the Mexican National Trios Championship with them. From 1993 through 2001, when the Mexican National Trios Championship returned to CMLL, the CMLL World Trios Championship was the only championship for the division.

In 1997 then-reigning champion Héctor Garza, who held the title along with Dos Caras and La Fiera, left CMLL, forcing the championship to be vacated. Subsequently, the team of Rey Bucanero, Emilio Charles Jr. and El Satánico won the championship in a tournament final over Apolo Dantés, Black Warrior, and Dr. Wagner Jr. In October 1998, the championship was vacated again when Mr. Niebla was injured, forcing his teammates Atlantis and Lizmark to give up the championship. The Lagunero team of Black Warrior, Blue Panther and Dr. Wagner Jr. defeated "Los Guapos" ("The Hansome Ones"; Bestia Salvaje, Scorpio Jr. and Zumbido) in the tournament finals, but vacated the championship in February 2002. Blue Panther and Dr. Wagner Jr. replaced Black Warrior with Fuerza Guerrera and defeated Black Warrior's new team of Mr. Niebla, Antifaz del Norte and Black Warrior himself. In 2006, the championship were vacated once again after not being defended for almost 20 months. Los Guerreros de Atlantida ("The Warriors from Atlantis"; Atlantis, Tarzan Boy and Último Guerrero) won the championship on September 29, 2006, and began defending it on a regular basis. In February 2007 Los Perros del Mal ("The Bad Dogs"; Perro Aguayo Jr., Mr. Águila and Héctor Garza) won the championship and held it for 15 months before splitting up and vacating the championship. The team of El Hijo del Fantasma, Héctor Garza and La Máscara won the tournament, defeating Blue Panther, Dos Caras Jr. and Místico in the finals. In 2015 CMLL's Guadalajara branch brought back the Occidente ("Western") Trios Championship, specifically for their shows held in Jalisco, Guadalajara. The Occidente championship is considered tertiary to both the world and national championships.

Reigns

Los Guerreros Laguneros (Euforia, Gran Guerrero and Último Guerrero) are the current trios champions, having defeated The Cl4n (Pronounced as "The Clan"; Ciber the Main Man, The Chris and Sharlie Rockstar) to win the title on September 28, 2018 as part of the CMLL 85th Anniversary Show. They are the 30th overall championship team and this is their first reign as a team. 27 teams have held the title, combining for 30 individual title reigns. Three teams have held the title more than once, the first champions Los Infernales, the team of Héctor Garza, Hijo del Fantasma and La Máscara and the current champions Los Guerreros Lagunero. Black Warrior, Blue Panther and Dr. Wagner Jr. holds the record for the longest single reign of any team, but due to the uncertainty of when the championship was vacated it can only be verified that they held them for a minimum of 1,141 days. Dr. Wagner Jr.'s four reigns combine to 2,051 days, the highest of any wrestler. Héctor Garza's five individual reigns is the record for the most reigns of any individual wrestler. All title matches take place under two out of three falls rules.

Tournaments

1991
CMLL held a 16-trios team tournament from October 25, 1991 to November 22, 1991 to determine the first ever CMLL World Trios Championship team. This was the third CMLL-branded world championship created by CMLL after the CMLL World Heavyweight Championship in May and the CMLL World Light Heavyweight Championship in September 1991. In the finals, Los Infernales (El Satánico, MS-1 and Pirata Morgan) defeated Los Brazos (El Brazo, Brazo de Oro and Brazo de Plata) to win the championship.

Tournament brackets
{{16TeamBracket-Compact-NoSeeds

| RD1-team01=Perro Aguayo, Ringo and Cachorro Mendoza
| RD1-score01=W
| RD1-team02=Emilio Charles Jr., La Fiera and Sangre Chicana
| RD1-score02= 

| RD1-team03=Jerry Estrada, Tony Arce and Vulcan
| RD1-score03= 
| RD1-team04=Octagón, El Dandy and Konnan El Barbaro| RD1-score04=W| RD1-team05=Los Infernales(El Satánico, MS-1 and Pirata Morgan)| RD1-score05=W| RD1-team06=Black Magic, Mano Negra and Vampiro Canadiense
| RD1-score06= 

| RD1-team07=Rayo de Jalisco Jr., Apolo Dantés and Justiciero| RD1-score07=W| RD1-team08=El Hijo del Gladiador, Gran Markus Jr. and Herodes
| RD1-score08= 

| RD1-team09=Los Brazos(El Brazo, Brazo de Oro and Brazo de Plata)| RD1-score09=W| RD1-team10=El Hijo del Santo, Blue Demon Jr. and El Hijo del Solitario
| RD1-score10= 

| RD1-team11=Los Hermanos Dinamita(Cien Caras, Máscara Año 2000 and Universo 2000)| RD1-score11=W| RD1-team12=Aníbal, Lizmark and Lizmark Jr.
| RD1-score12= 

| RD1-team13=Misterioso, Mogur and Voador
| RD1-score13= 
| RD1-team14=Blue Panther, Fuerza Guerrera and Pierroth Jr.| RD1-score14='W'| RD1-team15=Atlantis, Ángel Azteca and Super Astro| RD1-score15=W| RD1-team16=Ángel Blanco Jr., El Hijo del Ángel Blanco and Medico Asesino Jr.
| RD1-score16= 

| RD2-team01=Perro Aguayo, Ringo and Cachorro Mendoza
| RD2-score01= 
| RD2-team02=Octagón, El Dandy and Konnan El Barbaro| RD2-score02=W| RD2-team03=Los Infernales| RD2-score03=W| RD2-team04=Rayo de Jalisco Jr., Apolo Dantés and Justiciero
| RD2-score04= 

| RD2-team05=Los Brazos| RD2-score05=W| RD2-team06=Los Hermanos Dinamita
| RD2-score06= 

| RD2-team07=Blue Panther, Fuerza Guerrera and Pierroth Jr.
| RD2-score07= 
| RD2-team08=Atlantis, Ángel Azteca and Super Astro| RD2-score08=W| RD3-team01=Octagón, El Dandy and Konnan El Barbaro
| RD3-score01= 
| RD3-team02=Los Infernales| RD3-score02=W| RD3-team03=Los Brazos| RD3-score03=W| RD3-team04=Atlantis, Ángel Azteca and Super Astro
| RD3-score04= 

| RD4-team01=Los Infernales| RD4-score01=W'| RD4-team02=Los Brazos| RD4-score02= 

}}

1997
In early 1997 Héctor Garza, who was one-third of the reigning CMLL World Trios Champions alongside Dos Caras and La Fiera, left CMLL to join rival promotion AAA. CMLL vacated the championship and decided to hold a one-night, eight-team tournament to crown the new trios champions. The tournament took place on Friday March 21, 1997 on the undercard of the 1997 Homenaje a Salvador Lutteroth ("Homage to Salvador Lutteroth") show. In the finals, Emilio Charles Jr., Rey Bucanero and El Satánico defeated Apolo Dantés, Black Warrior, and Dr. Wagner Jr.

Tournament brackets

1998
In October 1998, Mr. Niebla suffered an injury, which forced CMLL to vacate the CMLL World Trios Championship as it was not clear when Mr. Niebla would be able to wrestle again. They held a three-show, eight-team tournament from December 4 to December 12, 1998. Former champions Atlantis and Lizmark teamed up with Emilio Charles Jr. for the tournament, while Mr. Niebla actually returned to action in time to be in the tournament as well, teaming up with Rayo de Jalisco Jr. and Shocker. In the finals the trio of Dr. Wagner Jr., Blue Panther and Black Warrior defeated Los Guapos (Scorpio Jr., Bestia Salvaje and Zumbido) to lay claim to the championship.

Tournament brackets

2008

In the summer of 2008 then-CMLL World Trios Champions Los Perros del Mal kicked Héctor Garza out of the group; at the time Garza held the championship alongside Perros members Perro Aguayo Jr. and Mr. Águila, forcing the championship to be vacated. CMLL held an eight-team tournament for the vacant championship, starting on May 30, with the finals on June 13, 2008, during CMLL's 2008 Infierno en el Ring event.

Tournament brackets

2013

In May 2013 long-time CMLL World Trios Champions El Bufete del Amor'' (Marco Corleone, Máximo and Rush) were forced to vacate the championship due to Corleone suffering a serious knee injury. CMLL held an eight-team, two-night tournament to determine the next champions. The tournament started on June 9, 2013 and the finals took place on June 16.

Tournament brackets

Footnotes

References

External links

Consejo Mundial de Lucha Libre championships
Trios wrestling tag team championships
World professional wrestling championships